Shanghai Yucai High school (育才学校) is a boarding school located in Shanghai, China. The school was established as Yuchai College on Fengyang Road, near Xinchang Road in 1901. In 1998, it moved to the current address in Jiading district.

In Shanghai, the school actually split into a junior high school and a senior high school. The junior high school stay in the original location in the city of Shanghai where the senior high school is located in Jiading, in the western suburb of Shanghai.

References

Educational institutions established in 1901
Schools in Shanghai
High schools in Shanghai
1901 establishments in China